Derryhale is a small village and townland (of 834 acres) in County Armagh, Northern Ireland. It lies between Portadown, Richhill and Tandragee. It is situated in the civil parish of Kilmore and the historic barony of Oneilland West. It had a population of 360 people (129 households) in the 2011 Census. (2001 Census: 246 people)

Archaeology

A Bronze Age hoard was found at Derryhale and included a star-shaped faience bead, knives with ridged tangs and pins.

Education
Derryhale Primary School

References

External links 

Derryhale - Some Historical Notes

Villages in County Armagh
Townlands of County Armagh